The attackJanuary 6 United States Capitol attack was followed by political, legal, and social repercussions. The second impeachment of Donald Trump, who was charged for incitement of insurrection for his conduct, occurred on January 13. At the same time, Cabinet officials were pressured to invoke the 25th Amendment for removing Trump from office. Trump was subsequently acquitted in the Senate trial, which was held in February after Trump had already left office. The result was a 57–43 vote in favor of conviction, with every Democrat and seven Republicans voting to convict, but two-thirds of the Senate (67 votes) are required to convict. Many in the Trump administration resigned. Several large companies announced they were halting all political donations, and others have suspended funding the lawmakers who had objected to certifying Electoral College results. A bill was introduced to form an independent commission, similar to the 9/11 Commission, to investigate the events surrounding the attack; it passed the House but was blocked by Republicans in the Senate. The House then approved a House "select committee" to investigate the attack. In June, the Senate released the results of its own investigation of the riot. The event led to strong criticism of law enforcement agencies. Leading figures within the United States Capitol Police resigned.

A large-scale criminal investigation was undertaken, with the Federal Bureau of Investigation (FBI) opening more than 400 case files. Federal law enforcement undertook a nationwide manhunt for the perpetrators, with arrests and indictments following within days. More than 615 people have been charged with federal crimes.

Per his involvement in inciting the storming of the Capitol, Trump was suspended from various social media sites, at first temporarily and then indefinitely. In response to posts by Trump supporters in favor of the attempts to overturn the election, the social networking site Parler was shut down by its service providers. Corporate suspensions of other accounts and programs associated with participating groups also took place.

The inauguration week was marked by nationwide security concerns. Unprecedented security preparations for the inauguration of Joe Biden were undertaken, including the deployment of 25,000 National Guard members. In May, the House passed a $1.9 billion Capitol security bill in response to the attack. 

In the days following the attack on the Capitol, Republican politicians in at least three states introduced legislation creating new prohibitions on protest activity.

Casualties
The deaths of five people who were present at the event have, to a varying degree, been related to it. A number of other people were injured, with severe injuries among members of law enforcement being documented.

Deaths

As lawmakers were being evacuated by Capitol Police, Ashli Elizabeth Babbitt, a 35-year-old Air Force veteran, attempted to climb through a shattered window in a barricaded door and was shot in the shoulder by Lt. Michael Leroy Byrd, dying from the wound. The shooting was recorded on several cameras. Capitol Police officers had been warned that many attackers were carrying concealed weapons, although a subsequent search revealed no weapons in Babbitt's possession. In the minutes before she was shot, the crowd had threatened police. A fellow rally attendee who was right near Babbitt recalled she had been warned not to proceed through the window: "A number of police and Secret Service were saying 'Get back! Get down! Get out of the way!'; she didn't heed the call..." Republican Representative Markwayne Mullin said he witnessed the shooting; he felt that Lt. Byrd "didn't have a choice" but to shoot, and that this action "saved people's lives". According to Mullin, at the time, law enforcement was trying to defend two fronts to the House Chamber from the mob, and "a lot of members [of Congress] and staff that were in danger at the time". Zachary Jordan Alam (who was standing next to Babbitt) was videotaped smashing the glass window that Babbitt tried to climb through. He was later indicted on twelve federal counts, including assaulting officers with a dangerous weapon. Following the routine process for shootings by Capitol Police officers, the D.C. Metropolitan Police Department and the Justice Department investigated Babbitt's death and declined to charge Lt. Byrd. Babbitt was a follower of the QAnon conspiracy theory, and had tweeted the previous day "the storm is here", a reference to its prophecy. There has since been an effort by conservative media and political figures to present her as a martyr.

Three other Trump supporters also died: Rosanne Boyland, 34, of Kennesaw, Georgia, Kevin Greeson, 55, from Athens, Alabama, and Benjamin Philips, 50, of Bloomsburg, Pennsylvania. Boyland was a radicalized follower of QAnon whose family had begged her not to attend. Initially thought to have been trampled to death by the crowd, she was later confirmed to have died of an amphetamine overdose during the riot. Her death was classified as accidental by the D.C. medical examiner's office. Greeson reportedly had a heart attack outdoors on the Capitol grounds, and was declared dead at 2:05p.m., shortly before the breach of the Capitol. He had become a radicalized Trump supporter in the preceding years; in December 2020, he declared: "Let's take this fucking Country BACK!! Load your guns and take to the streets!" His family said he was "not there to participate in violence or rioting, nor did he condone such actions". Philips was initially reported to have died of a stroke after splitting from his group at 10:30 in the morning. There is no indication that he had participated in the storming. Philips was the founder of Trumparoo.com, a social media page for Trump supporters, and he made arrangements for fellow supporters to travel to D.C. Greeson and Philips' deaths were later confirmed to be natural deaths from both coronary heart disease and hypertensive heart disease, ruled the D.C. medical examiner's office.

 Four police officers who defended the capitol during the riot have subsequently died by suicide.

Injuries 

Participants in the civil disorder and responders had been injured in the struggle. There were 138 officers (73 Capitol Police and 65 Metropolitan Police) injured, of whom 15 were hospitalized, some with severe injuries. All had been released from the hospital by January 11.

Shortly after 2:00p.m., several rioters attempted to breach a door on the West Front of the Capitol. They dragged three D.C. Metro police officers out of formation and down a set of stairs, trapped them in a crowd, and assaulted them with improvised weapons (including hockey sticks, crutches, flags, poles, sticks, and stolen police shields) as the mob chanted "police stand down!" and "USA!" At least one of the officers was also stomped.

Some rioters beat officers on the head with lead pipes, and others used chemical irritants, stun guns, fists, sticks, poles and clubs against the police. Some trampled and stampeded police, pushed them down stairs or against statues or shone laser pointers into their eyes. One D.C. Metro officer was hit six times with a stun gun, was beaten with a flagpole, suffered a mild heart attack, and lost a fingertip. Three officers were hit on their heads by a fire extinguisher allegedly thrown by a retired firefighter.

According to the Capitol Police officers' union chairman, multiple officers sustained traumatic brain injuries. One had two cracked ribs and two smashed spinal discs; another lost an eye. One was stabbed with a metal fence stake, and another lost three fingers. One was crushed between a door and a riot shield while defending the west side of the Capitol with other officers against rioters; he later had headaches he believed stemmed from a concussion.

Morale among the Capitol Police plummeted after the riots. The department responded to several incidents where its officers threatened to harm themselves; one officer turned in her weapon because she feared what she would do with it. Two police officers who responded to the attack died by suicide in the following days: one Capitol Police officer, Officer Howard Liebengood, three days after the attack, and a D.C. Metro Police officer, Officer Jeffrey Smith, who had been injured in the attack, afterward. Some members of Congress and press reports have included these deaths in the casualty count, for a total of seven deaths. Metropolitan Police Officers Kyle DeFreytag and Gunther Hashida died by suicide on July 10 and July 29, respectively; both had responded to the Capitol attack.

As of June 3, 2021, at least 17 police officers (10 Capitol Police, seven Metropolitan Police) remained out of work due to injuries sustained in the riot five months previously. Of that number, six Metropolitan Police officers were still on medical leave in mid-July; the Capitol Police did not disclose how many of its officers were on leave, but confirmed that some officers had acquired career-ending disabilities.

Completion of electoral vote count 

Congress reconvened in the evening of January6 after the Capitol was cleared of trespassers. Senate Majority Leader Mitch McConnell reopened the Senate's session around 8:00 p.m., saying the Senate refused to be intimidated and that it would count the electors and declare the president "tonight", after two hours of debate on the objection to the Arizona electors. He called the vote the most consequential in his thirty-plus years of congressional service. At 9:58, the Senate rejected the objection 93–6, with only six Republicans voting in favor: Ted Cruz (TX), Josh Hawley (MO), Cindy Hyde-Smith (MS), John Neely Kennedy (LA), Roger Marshall (KS), and Tommy Tuberville (AL).

At 11:08 p.m., the House rejected a similar motion to dispute the Arizona vote by a margin of 303–121. All the "yeas" came from Republicans while the "nays" were from 83 Republicans and 220 Democrats. A planned objection to the Georgia slate of electors was rejected after co-signing Senator, Kelly Loeffler (R-GA), withdrew her support in light of the day's events. Another objection was raised by Hawley and Representative Scott Perry (R–PA) to the Pennsylvania slate of electors, triggering another two-hour split in the joint session to debate the objection. At 12:30a.m. on January7, the Senate rejected this objection by a 92–7 vote, with the same people voting the same way as before with the exceptions of Senators Cynthia Lummis (R-WY) and Rick Scott (R-FL) voting in favor and John N. Kennedy voting against.

At 3:08, the House of Representatives similarly rejected the motion to sustain the objection by a margin of 282–138. Again, all the votes in favor were Republican, while this time only 64 Republicans voted against and 218 Democrats voted against. Representative Peter Meijer (R–MI) said that several of his Republican colleagues in the House would have voted to certify the votes, but did not out of fear for the safety of their families, and that at least one specifically voted to overturn Biden's victory against their conscience because they were shaken by the mob attack that day.

At 3:41, Congress confirmed the outcome of the Electoral College vote, Biden's 306 votes to Trump's 232, with Pence declaring that Biden and Harris would take office on January 20.

Criminal investigations and charges 

The U.S. Department of Justice is probing whether to bring seditious conspiracy charges against some of those involved in the attack. Regarding calls for the president to be prosecuted for inciting the violence, Interim United States Attorney for the District of Columbia Michael R. Sherwin said any Capitol Police officer found to have assisted the rioters would be charged, and he further suggested that Trump could be investigated for comments he made to his supporters before they stormed the Capitol and that others who "assisted or facilitated or played some ancillary role" in the events could also be investigated. Federal prosecutors were also considering whether to pursue charges under the Racketeer Influenced and Corrupt Organizations Act, which is typically used to prosecute organized crime syndicates, against groups such as Proud Boys and Oath Keepers. 

By March 2021, the Justice Department said the "investigation and prosecution of the Capitol Attack will likely be one of the largest in American history, both in terms of the number of defendants prosecuted and the nature and volume of the evidence". The Department asked courts to delay most cases by at least two months so the volumes of cases and evidence could be better managed. 

Some Trump supporters attacked with metal pipes, discharged chemical irritants, and brandished other weapons. A number of them were arrested for offenses such as possession and carry of unlicensed pistols, carrying a rifle without a license, possessing a high capacity feeding device, carrying unregistered ammunition, possession of a prohibited weapon (taser) and possessing illegal fireworks. One defendant allegedly had, inside his truck, an AR-15 style rifle, a shotgun, a crossbow, several machetes, smoke grenades and 11 Molotov cocktails.

On August 20, 2021, Reuters reported that the FBI investigation did not find meaningful evidence that the attack was centrally coordinated by way of a broader plot, such that would involve well known Trump-allied public figures, and cast doubt on the likelihood of charges of seditious conspiracy being brought.

Arrests 

Notable arrests include: West Virginia state lawmaker Derrick Evans, who later resigned from office; Klete Keller, a former U.S. Olympic swimmer; the leader of a Proud Boys group in Hawaii; Jake Angeli, also known as the "QAnon Shaman"; far-right activist Tim "Baked Alaska" Gionet; Aaron Mostofsky, the 34-year-old son of a Brooklyn Supreme Court judge; L. Brent Bozell IV, a scion of a prominent conservative family, whose father is L. Brent Bozell III and grandfather is L. Brent Bozell Jr.; Jon Schaffer, frontman of heavy metal band Iced Earth and lifetime member of the Oath Keepers; and two people who work for Infowars, host Owen Shroyer and video editor Samuel Montoya.

Others arrested include Richard "Bigo" Barnett, the leader of an Arkansas gun rights organization who stole a letter from Pelosi's desk; Larry Rendell Brock, a retired Air Force Reserve officer from Texas who roamed the Senate chamber in a green tactical vest with a white flex cuff; Lonnie Coffman, whose truck was found two blocks from the Capitol containing eleven homemade bombs, an assault rifle, and a handgun; Douglas Jenson, who led a mob of rioters chasing Officer Goodman; Robert Keith Packer, who wore a "Camp Auschwitz" T-shirt; William Merry Jr, who ripped off a chunk of Pelosi's nameplate above her office; and Adam Johnson, who allegedly stole Pelosi's lectern.

Other investigations

Congressional 
On January7, 2021, five House Committees (House Committee on Oversight and Reform, House Committee on the Judiciary, House Committee on Homeland Security, House Permanent Select Committee on Intelligence, & House Committee on Armed Services) sent a letter to Federal Bureau of Investigation (FBI) Director Christopher Wray seeking an immediate briefing on the FBI's efforts to investigate the deadly attack on the U.S. Capitol.

House Speaker Nancy Pelosi touched upon the investigations in a speech on January 15, stating that "if, in fact, it is found that members of Congress were accomplices to this insurrection, if they aided and abetted the crime, there may have to be actions taken beyond the Congress in terms of prosecution for that." That same day, Pelosi established Task Force 1-6 and appointed retired Lt. General Russel Honoré to lead "an immediate review of security infrastructure, interagency processes and command and control." The mandate of the task forces was to determine what security failures enabled the pro-Trump insurrectionists to overrun the building and delay congressional certification of the results of the 2020 presidential election.

On January 16, 2021, The House Committees on Oversight & Reform, Judiciary, Homeland Security, and Intelligence requested relevant documents and briefings from the FBI, Department of Homeland Security's Office of Intelligence & Analysis, the National Counterterrorism Center, and the Office of the Director of National Intelligence as part of "a review of the events and intelligence surrounding the insurrection on January 6th incited by President Trump, and related threats against the nation's peaceful transition of power, including the Inauguration."

On March 5, 2021, Task Force 1-6 finalized their 6-week long security review and published their findings. The 15 page document recommended numerous changes to improve the Capitol Police's ability to respond to a crisis. Some of which included the following: 
 Increasing the size of the Capitol Police and expanding USCP's intelligence team
 Give the USCP Chief the authority to request external law enforcement and National Guard support without CPB preapproval in "extraordinary emergency circumstances"
 Have USCP take immediate action to eliminate personnel shortfalls, currently 233 officers, through enhanced recruiting and incentive programs. Additionally, the Task Force requested that Congress immediately authorize appropriations to enable the Sergeants at Arms to procure security systems for all Member district offices and residences.

The report has been criticized for its lacked an of explanation as to the lack of security at the Capitol to begin with. Capitol Police, the Metro D.C. Police, nor the military took any special measures knowing well in advance that thousands would descend on Washington D.C. that morning, including armed groups such as the Proud Boys.

Independent January 6 commission 

On February 13, Pelosi announced plans for a bicameral commission to investigate the attack on the Capitol, modeled after the National Commission on Terrorist Attacks Upon the United States (9/11 Commission), an independent panel that investigated the attacks of September 11, 2001. The 9/11 Commission was created in 2002 by Congress and, fifteen months later, issued a detailed report on its findings. Pelosi and Minority Member, Kevin McCarthy tasked the highest ranking members of the House Homeland Security Committee (Chair Bennie Thompson (D-MS) and Ranking Member John Katko (R-NY)) to negotiate and establish the establishment resolution for the commission. Despite initial bipartisan support for a commission, by March, disputes between Democrats and Republicans over the scope of the proposed investigation and whether the commission would have an equal number of members from each party stalled the commission's creation.

On May 14, 2021, Thompson and Katko announced H.R. 3233, or the National Commission to Investigate the January 6 Attack on the United States Capitol Complex Act. The resolution was ultimately introduced to the house on May 19 met all Republican objections; it contained an equal number of members from each party, required approval of both parties to issue subpoenas, and set a firm deadline of December 31, 2021, to complete the report. The bill to form the commission passed the House of Representatives by a vote of 252-175, with 35 Republicans and every Democrat supporting it. However, on May 28, Senate Republicans used a filibuster to block taking up the bill.

Senate's Investigation 
On June 8, 2021, the Senate released the results of its investigation of the riot, led by the Senate Rules and Homeland Security & Governmental Affairs committees, and conducted on a bipartisan basis. The investigation received a degree of cooperation from the FBI, the Department of Homeland Security, the Justice Department and the House Sergeant at Arms, while other agencies did not hand over documents on time. The report was the most comprehensive official account of the event up to that point, while remaining confined to security preparations and law enforcement response, with some of the findings reiterating parts of existing reports. The motivations of participants, and those of Donald Trump, were not probed, and his conduct was not treated in a contextual manner, e.g. Trump's January 6 speech was included in an appendix.

According to the report, Capitol Police was aware of a threat, but did not take it seriously, did not share intelligence, did not incorporate the warnings into the operational plan for January 6, and, ultimately, the force lacked the capacity to respond; more than a dozen intelligence failures are recounted. A number of recommendations, some related to potential new legislation, are listed.

Formation of the House select committee 

In late May, when it had become apparent that the filibuster of the bicameral commission would not be overcome, Pelosi indicated that she would appoint a select committee to investigate the events as a fallback option. On June 30, 2021, the measure (House Resolution 503) to form the committee passed by a vote of 222 to 190, with all Democratic members and two Republican members, Adam Kinzinger and Liz Cheney, voting in favor. Sixteen Republican members did not vote on the measure. 

On July 27, 2021, almost a month after the Select Committee was established, the Select Committee had their first public hearing. Four police officers (Pfc. Harry Dunn and Sgt. Aquilino Gonell of the U.S. Capitol Police, and Michael Fanone and Daniel Hodges of the Washington, D.C., Metropolitan Police Department) testified about the physical assaults and verbal threats they faced responding to the attack at the U.S. Capitol in a highly emotional hearing.

Throughout the rest of 2021 and beginning of 2022, the Select Committee has interviewed hundreds of persons of interest and received thousands of documents. Additionally, the Select Committee voted to hold Trump allies Peter Navarro, Dan Scavino, Steven Bannon and Mark Meadows in contempt of congress. However the Department of Justice has declined to charge Meadows or Scavino. The DOJ has charged Navarro and Bannon. 

In early June 2022, after months of delaying their next public hearings, the Select Committee announced the beginning of their first set of public hearings (For more detail about the hearings, United States House Select Committee on the January 6 Attack public hearings)

Department of Defense 
In a letter to acting U.S. Defense Secretary Christopher C. Miller on January 11, Senator Tammy Duckworth (D-IL) asked the Department of Defense to investigate the role of active or retired members of the U.S. military in the attack and for any people identified to be held accountable. Representatives Ruben Gallego (D-AZ) and Sara Jacobs (D-CA) also called on Miller to work alongside federal authorities to identify members of the military involved in the riot.

After the Capitol siege, the Defense Department intensified efforts to root out far-right extremism among military personnel. In 2020, the FBI notified the Defense Department that it had initiated criminal investigations involving 68 military personnel (many retired or discharged) associated with domestic extremism. The National Defense Authorization Act for Fiscal Year 2021, enacted by Congress shortly before the attack on the Capitol, directed the Defense Department to create a deputy inspector general for diversity and inclusion and supremacist, extremism and criminal gang activity (within the DOD office of inspector general) and to keep track of gang and extremist activity in the military. Miller directed a strengthening of military policy against service personnel participating in extremist or hate groups, an issue to be addressed as part of a wider Defense Department report due on March 31, with a plan of action due on June 30.

Disciplinary 
In September, Capitol Police said that its office of professional responsibility had started 38 internal investigations, as a result of which it has recommended disciplinary action against six members of the force for their conduct during the attack; no criminal charges were announced.

Nongovernmental

New York State Bar Association 
On January11, the New York State Bar Association (NYSBA) announced that it has launched an inquiry into Rudy Giuliani for his role in the uprising, which could subject him to expulsion from the association and recommendation for disbarment if he is held liable. Giuliani had addressed the crowd before it marched towards the Capitol, saying evidence that the election had been stolen was plentiful and proposing "trial by combat".

Crowdsourced 
Wired magazine has reported that numerous crowdsourced open-source intelligence efforts at tracking participants in the storming were underway, including an investigation by the investigative journalism network Bellingcat and the open source intelligence database Intelligence X. According to Gizmodo, almost the entire contents of the Alt-tech social media site Parler have been archived online, including large numbers of photos and video with GPS metadata, and that analysis of the GPS coordinates suggested that numerous Parler users had been involved in the storming of the Capitol.

Employers 
Multiple people involved in the riot have been investigated by their workplaces, with some being fired for their participation, as some businesses were identified by social media users who called for negative reviews and comments to be posted or the establishments to be boycotted.

Most businesses who have done so are private businesses, as those who work for the government and unionized workers hold more protections from firing. The earliest report of participants being fired was a Maryland man identified in several highly publicized pictures, wearing his work ID badge and fired from his position the next day.

Following the riot, the police departments of Anne Arundel County, Maryland; New York City; Philadelphia; Rocky Mount, Virginia; San Antonio, Texas; Seattle, Washington; Troy, New Hampshire; and Zelienople, Pennsylvania; the Kentucky State Police; the SEPTA Transit Police; and the sheriff's departments of Charles County, Maryland, Bexar County, Texas, and Franklin County, Kentucky, all investigated, reassigned or suspended officers for their involvement in the invasion of the Capitol or the preceding events. Other law enforcement officers were investigated for making statements in support of the rally and riot.

Scrutiny of police response 

Law enforcement's intelligence, communication, and operational failures, which allowed the mob to breach the Capitol, attracted scrutiny to the Capitol Police, and the FBI, as well as other law enforcement agencies involved. The three top security officials for Congressthe chief of the Capitol Police, the Senate sergeant at arms, and the House sergeant at armsall resigned. The acting Capitol Police chief Yogananda Pittman, who took over leadership of the force two days after the attack on the Capitol, subsequently said in congressional testimony that the response to the attack as a "multi-tiered failure" by law enforcement.

Questions have been raised in some media outlets regarding alleged discrepancies in the police response to Black Lives Matter protesters and the rioters who stormed the U.S. Capitol. According to an analysis by The Guardian of statistics collected by the US Crisis Monitor, "Police in the United States are three times more likely to use force against leftwing protesters than rightwing protesters", regardless of whether the protest is peaceful or violent.

Trump administration resignations 
Dozens of Trump administration officeholders resigned in reaction to the Capitol storming, even though their terms in office would expire fourteen days later with the inauguration of President Biden. Some senior officials, however, decided against resigning in order to ensure an "orderly transition of power" to the incoming Biden administration, out of concern that Trump would replace them with loyalist lower-level staffers who they feared could carry out illegal orders given by him.

The high-ranking officials who resigned include Robert C. O'Brien, the National Security Advisor, and four executive department heads: Elaine Chao (Transportation), Betsy DeVos (Education), Chad Wolf (Homeland Security), and Alex Azar (Health and Human Services).

Impeachment and trial 

On January 11, 2021, Representatives David Cicilline (D-RI), Jamie Raskin (D-MD), and Ted Lieu (D-CA) introduced to the House a single article of impeachment against Trump, which they had written, for "incitement of insurrection" in urging his supporters to march on the Capitol building. Trump was impeached for the second time on January 13, becoming the only federal official in United States history to have ever been impeached twice. On February 13, following a five-day Senate trial, Trump was acquitted when the Senate voted 57–43 for conviction, falling ten votes short of the two-thirds majority required to convict; seven Republicans joined every Democrat in voting to convict, the most bipartisan support in any Senate impeachment trial of a president.

Crackdowns on extremist content and Trump connections 

The role of social media in the storming of the Capitol created pressure for platforms to strengthen enforcement of moderation policies prohibiting extremist content to prevent further violence. The response of social media platforms renewed accusations by some conservatives that their policies and enforcement promote an implicit ideological bias by limiting the expression of conservative political and social viewpoints even through controversial or false statements. The First Amendment, however, only restricts government-sanctioned limits on speech, and its protections do not apply to private entities and to obscene or defamatory speech.

Corporate suspensions of Trump's social media, content, and connections 

Twitter assessed that two of Trump's tweets on January8 could be mobilized by different audiences to incite violence and replicate the criminal acts perpetrated at the Capitol on January 6 and suspended Trump's main account first for twelve hours and then permanently. Following this, Trump attempted to access alternate accounts, such as the official President of the United States (@POTUS) account, on the platform to continue tweeting and to bemoan the suspension of his account. Still, all tweets were subsequently deleted, and the accounts were either suspended or banned. Furthermore, Trump was banned from other major social media outlets including Facebook, YouTube, and Snapchat. In the days following the riots, multiple social media companies began suspending or permanently banning several accounts and users who spread or aided the conspiracy theories that led the storming of the Capitol. In total, Twitter banned more than seventy thousand QAnon-related accounts.

On January10, the Professional Golfers' Association of America (PGA) exercised its contractual right to terminate its arrangement to host the 2022 PGA Championship at Trump National Golf Club in Bedminster, New Jersey, which had been awarded the tournament in 2014. The PGA said that it had "become clear that conducting the PGA Championship at Trump Bedminster would be detrimental to the PGA of America brand"; Trump had spent years trying to land a golf championship at one of his resorts. The next day, the R&A followed suit, saying it would not hold any of its championships "in the foreseeable future" at Trump Turnberry in Scotland. Also on January 10, Stripe announced it would stop processing online card payments to Trump's campaign for violating its terms of service against encouraging violence. Other companies reportedly seeking to cut ties with Trump include Deutsche Bank and Signature Bank.

Corporate suspensions of other accounts and programs 

Twitter also banned accounts deemed to be "solely dedicated to sharing QAnon content", including those belonging to former national security adviser Michael Flynn and his son Michael FlynnJr., attorneys Sidney Powell and L.Lin Wood (both of whom brought failed lawsuits challenging the election results), and former 8chan administrator Ron Watkins. Twitter's ban of Trump and others was criticized by some Trump allies, as well as some foreign leaders.

Also on January8, Discord banned a pro-Trump server called "TheDonald", which had ties to the banned subreddit r/The Donald. Discord cited the connection between the server and The Donald's online forum, which was used in planning the riot. Parler removed several posts from Wood espousing conspiracy theories and violent rhetoric, including a call for Vice President Pence and others to be subjected to firing squads, for violating community rules on speech encouraging violence. YouTube terminated two accounts belonging to former White House chief strategist Steve Bannon, including one hosting his "War Room" podcast, for repeated community guidelines violations pertaining to misinformation about widespread fraud or errors that affected the 2020 election's outcome.

On January10, Parler, a microblogging and social networking service, with a significant user base of Donald Trump supporters, conservatives, conspiracy theorists, and far-right extremists was shut down after Amazon terminated its hosting services, saying that it had sent reports of 98 instances of posts that "clearly encourage and incite violence" to Parler in the weeks preceding the decision.

On January 12, Facebook and Twitter announced that they were removing content related to the "Stop the Steal" movement and suspending 70,000 QAnon-focused accounts, respectively.

Airbnb cancelled all reservations in Washington, D.C., for the week of January 20 (refunding affected hosts out of its own money), and deactivated accounts of any users who it found belonged to hate groups and/or participated in the storming of the Capitol.

The day of the storming of the Capitol, Cumulus Media, owner of several conservative talk radio programs through Westwood One, sent an internal memo directing its employees to stop questioning the outcome of the election on-air, on threat of being fired.

Revocation of Trump honorary degrees, contracts, and other connections 
New York City Mayor Bill de Blasio in a video conference stated that Trump committed a "criminal act" and as such the city would terminate all contracts with the Trump Organization and would not do any business with them any longer. Specifically, New York City would take steps to terminate contracts with the Trump Organization to operate the Central Park Carousel, the Wollman & Lasker skating rinks, as well as the Ferry Point Golf Course. De Blasio stated that the city was working to find new vendors to take over the facilities to continue to provide services to customers. De Blasio ended that Trump would "no longer profit" with his relationship with New York City.

After the assault on the Capitol, Lehigh University and Wagner College revoked the honorary degrees they had conferred upon Trump in 1988 and 2004, respectively. The revocations of the honors left Liberty University as the only institution that gave an honorary degree to Trump. The board of the SAG-AFTRA voted "overwhelmingly" that probable cause existed to expel Trump from the entertainment union, to which Trump had belonged since 1989. The guild cited Trump's role in the January 6 riot at the Capitol, and his "reckless campaign of misinformation aimed at discrediting and ultimately threatening the safety of journalists, many of whom are SAG-AFTRA members." Trump later resigned from the union before the matter of his expulsion came before the union's disciplinary committee.

Splintering of participant groups 

The New York Times reported in March 2021 that the incident had caused groups like Proud Boys, Oath Keepers and the Groyper Army to splinter amid disagreements on whether the storming had gone too far or was a success, and doubts about the leadership of their organizations, reactivating concerns of increasing numbers of lone wolf actors who would be more difficult to monitor and might take more extreme actions.

Political donors 

Several large companies announced they were suspending all political donations. Others ceased funding the lawmakers who had objected to certifying Electoral College results and who became pejoratively known as the Sedition Caucus. However, some of them later reversed course. By November 2021, Republicans had fundraised more than Democrats. Republicans also fundraised more in the first nine months of 2021 than they had in the equivalent time periods in the election cycles 4 and 8 years earlier.

Security measures 

Following the storming of the Capitol and increased incidents of harassment, members of Congress received additional security as they traveled through airports. Through Biden's inauguration, Capitol Police were to be stationed at D.C.-area airports (Reagan National, Baltimore-Washington, and Dulles) and the Transportation Security Administration (TSA) was to increase its screening of DC-bound air passengers.

On a private call on January 11, Capitol Police spoke with House Democrats about the possibility of making members of Congress pass through metal detectors for Biden's inauguration. Following the call, a lawmaker told HuffPost that concern had been raised about "all these [Congress] members who were in league with the insurrectionists who love to carry their guns." On January 12, acting House Sergeant-at-Arms Timothy Blodgett informed lawmakers that anyone entering the House chamber (including members of Congress) would have to pass through metal detectors. Security screening remained in place after Biden's inauguration. The House passed a rule on February 2 that anyone who did not complete the screening would be fined $5,000 for a first offense and $10,000 from a second offense, to be deducted from their salaries; within several days of the rule's passage, two Republican representatives were fined.

Security was also put on high alert at the Capitol itself; a "non-scalable" security fence was placed around the Capitol and 6,200 members of the National Guard were expected to deploy to the national capital region by the weekend. A new security perimeter was created for the January 20 presidential inauguration, blocking off large portions of the city near Capitol Hill. The mayor announced parking facilities would be sealed off on January 15, and that delivery vehicles serving businesses in the security zone would be screened on entry. The Washington Metro announced it would close 11–13 subway stations from January 15 to 21 and re-route buses around the security zone to discourage people from traveling to the area. The night before the inauguration, 25,000 National Guard members arrived in Washington, D.C., and they were authorized to use lethal force.

Inauguration week protests 

Minor protests occurred during inauguration week, which featured the participation of far-right militia groups that follow right-libertarianism, neo-fascism, neo-Nazism, white supremacism, and other ultranationalist or right-wing ideologies as well as members of the New Black Panther Party, and the QAnon and boogaloo movements.

Concerns over March 4, 2021 plot 

Security was bolstered in Washington, D.C., in preparation for March 4, which QAnon adherents, adopting a false belief from sovereign citizen ideology, believed would be the day Trump was re-inaugurated as president. The House prematurely ended its work for the week following an announcement by the Capitol Police of intelligence on a "possible plot" by an identified militia group to breach the Capitol building on that day.

Planned U.S. Capitol Police field offices 

Responding to increased threats towards lawmakers and other security measures implemented in the wake of the riot, the United States Capitol Police announced plans to open field offices in the areas of San Francisco, California, and Tampa, Florida, on July 6. A police spokesperson also said other regional offices are being expected.

Concerns over "Justice for J6" rally 

The event passed with minor incidents while remaining a generally peaceful small-scale demonstration. Four people were arrested before and after the rally, although D.C. police said they made no arrests related to the rally. Earlier in the day, two people were arrested for outstanding firearms violation warrants. One man arrested nearby was found to be in possession of a large knife. Another arrested 15 minutes after the rally, a US Customs and Border Protection officer, was found to be in possession of a gun but was not prosecuted.

Concerns over January 6, 2022 
In the days leading up to the first anniversary of the attack, federal and local law enforcement agencies began increasing security in anticipation of potential violence. Homeland Security Secretary Alejandro Mayorkas said that there is a "heightened level of [general] threat", but that the Department of Homeland Security (DHS) is unaware of any credible threats. On January 5, 2022, federal officials noted an increase in unspecified calls for violence and rebellion on forums frequented by domestic violent extremists, but none of them suggested a specific threat or a coordinated plan. Earlier, an intelligence assessment released on December 31, 2021, warned of "threat actors" taking advantage of the anniversary, with lone offenders being the most likely threat.

Concerns over the 2022 United States midterm elections 
According to CNN, law enforcement officials and homeland security expect more extremist violence during the 2022 United States midterm elections.

Legislation

Security bill 
On May 20, the House passed a $1.9 billion Capitol security bill in response to the attack by a vote of 213–212. The bill would reimburse the National Guard and the District of Columbia, who have helped secure the Capitol, install new Capitol security features such as retractable fencing and hardened windows and doors, provide more funding for Capitol police, create a new force within the National Guard to respond to future emergencies at the Capitol, provide funding for the protection of lawmakers and federal judges, and provide funding for the prosecution of suspects in the riot. Unexpectedly, 3 progressive Democrats voted against the bill and another 3 voted "present", stating that they had concerns about Capitol Police accountability. The modified bill, with spending increased to $2.1 billion, was passed by Congress on July 29.

Anti-protest legislation 
In the days following the attack on the Capitol, Republican politicians in at least three states introduced legislation creating new prohibitions on protest activity.

In Florida, a bill based on legislation proposed in response to the George Floyd protests against police brutality in summer 2020 was introduced by State Senator Danny Burgess on January 6. The bill, which would protect Confederate monuments; permit the state to overrule local governments' decisions to reduce funding for police; waive sovereign immunity for municipalities, thereby allowing local authorities to be sued for providing inadequate law enforcement; and block people injured while participating in protests from receiving damages, was described by Governor Ron DeSantis as an effort to prevent events like the Capitol attack. In Mississippi, a bill was introduced on January 7 that would criminalize blocking traffic, throwing objects, pulling down monuments, causing emotional distress, any activity by a group of six or more people that "disturbs any person in the enjoyment of a legal right", or aiding a person doing any of these; it would also prevent protesters from suing police, prevent municipalities from reducing funding for police, and expand the state's stand-your-ground law. In Indiana, a bill also introduced on January 7 would criminalize camping at the Indiana Statehouse, which was the site of protests in June 2020, and introduce mandatory sentences for anyone convicted of battery against a police officer or emergency service professional.

Law enforcement award bill 
H.R. 3325 (An Act to award four congressional gold medals to the United States Capitol Police and those who protected the U.S. Capitol on January 6, 2021) was signed into federal law by President of the United States Joe Biden on August 5, 2021. It is a bill to award the Congressional Gold Medal to the police officers who defended the United States Capitol during the attack on January 6, 2021. The bill was first introduced in the House of Representatives on May 19, 2021. It was passed unanimously by the United States Senate on August 4, 2021. It was signed by the president on August 5, 2021, in a Rose Garden ceremony, attended by the officers' widows. The text of the bill specifically lauds Washington, D.C. police officer Jeffrey L. Smith and U.S. Capitol Police officers Howard Liebengood and Brian Sicknick, both of whom died after the insurrection. At its signing, President Biden also referenced U.S. Capitol Police Officer Billy Evans, who defended the Capitol on January 6 and was killed on duty during the Capitol car attack on April 2, 2021. Officer Evans' children were with Biden when he signed the bill.

Lawsuits 

On February 16, 2021, U.S. Representative Bennie Thompson (D-MS), the chairman of the House Homeland Security Committee, sued Donald Trump for conspiring to incite the violent assault at the Capitol. Thompson is represented by the NAACP. Also named defendants in the federal civil lawsuit are Trump's former personal lawyer Giuliani, the Proud Boys, and the Oath Keepers. The lawsuit alleges that the defendants violated the 1871 Ku Klux Klan Act by preventing Congress from carrying out its constitutional duties "by the use of force, intimidation, and threat". The law was first passed following the Civil War to combat the Ku Klux Klan violence against African Americans.

On August 13, 2021, the widow of Police Officer Jeffrey L. Smith, and the Estate of Jeffrey L. Smith filed a wrongful death, assault, batters, and aiding and abetting lawsuit against two assailants who were identified as having attacked Officer Smith in the Capitol. As described in news sources, Smith's counsel David P. Weber enlisted the assistance of online open source intelligence investigators, to locate and identify the assailants so they could be sued. Criminal charges against both assailants are pending, as is the civil lawsuit in the United States District Court for the District of Columbia.

On October 18, 2021, Trump filed a lawsuit against Thompson, the United States House Select Committee to Investigate the January 6th Attack on the United States Capitol, David Ferriero (Archivist of the National Archives) and the National Archives, seeking an injunction against the release of records related to communications made with the Trump administration on the day of the attack. The lawsuit claims the request and the committee are partisan shams and illegitimate.

On December 14, 2021, Washington D.C. Attorney General Karl Racine filed a lawsuit in District of Columbia's federal court, seeking damages from the Proud Boys and the Oath Keepers, claiming that both groups conspired to overturn the results of the 2020 in a coordinated act of domestic terrorism. The lawsuit seeks monetary damages for injuries, property damage, and additional costs.

On January 10, 2022, a federal judge considered whether Trump and other Republican officials were immune from liability in three civil lawsuits. Two had been brought by Democratic U.S. Representatives including Eric Swalwell, and a third had been filed on March 30, 2021, by injured Capitol Police officers James Blassingame and Sidney Hemby. The defendants—including Donald Trump (represented by lawyer Jesse Binnall), Donald Trump Jr., Representative Mo Brooks, Rudy Giuliani, the Proud Boys, and the Oath Keepers—had requested immunity on the grounds of the First Amendment. Those who were elected officials also claimed immunity based on that status. They asked the judge to dismiss the lawsuits. The judge, however, observed that Trump took no action for two hours on January 6. A "reasonable person" would have clarified his own message to stop the violence, the judge argued, yet Trump failed to "denounce the conduct immediately...and sent a tweet that arguably exacerbated things." The judge did not rule immediately following the hearing. The same court was scheduled to hear arguments for six more lawsuits related to January 6.

Potential spread of COVID-19 

Public health experts have said that the riot was a potential COVID-19 superspreader event. Anthony Fauci, director of the National Institute of Allergy and Infectious Diseases and lead member of the White House Coronavirus Task Force, said that the rioters' failure to "adhere to the fundamentals of public health" to prevent the spread of COVID-19—such as "universal wearing of masks, keeping physical distance, [and] avoiding crowds in congregate settings"—placed them at risk. The day after the event, Eric Toner, a senior scholar from the Johns Hopkins Center for Health Security, said the storming of the Capitol was "extraordinarily dangerous" from a public-health perspective.

Impact and legacy

Contemporary analysis and terminology 

A week following the attack, journalists were searching for an appropriate word to describe the event. According to the Associated Press, U.S. media outlets first described the developments on January 6 as "a rally or protest", but as the events of the day escalated and further reporting and images emerged, the descriptions shifted to "an assault, a riot, an insurrection, domestic terrorism or even a coup attempt". It was variably observed that the media outlets were settling on the terms "riot" and "insurrection". According to NPR, "By definition, 'insurrection,' and its derivative, 'insurgency,' are accurate. 'Riot' and 'mob' are equally correct. While these words are not interchangeable, they are all suitable when describing Jan. 6." The New York Times assessed the event as having brought the United States "hours away from a full-blown constitutional crisis". Presciently, Brian Stelter, in CNN Business, wrote that the events of the Capitol attack "will be remembered as an act of domestic terrorism against the United States".

The Encyclopædia Britannica, described the attack "as an insurrection or attempted coup d'état". The encyclopedia added that "The Federal Bureau of Investigation (FBI) and other law-enforcement agencies also considered it an act of domestic terrorism." Furthermore, Encyclopædia Britannica classifies the Capitol attack under the topic of domestic terrorism and describes the United States Capitol as a "scene of domestic terrorism when supporters of Pres. Donald Trump stormed the building as Congress was in the process of certifying Joe Biden's victory in the 2020 presidential election".

Federal judge David Carter described Trump's actions as "a coup in search of a legal theory". Naunihal Singh of the U.S. Naval War College, and author of Seizing Power: The Strategic Logic of Military Coups, wrote that the attack on the Capitol was "an insurrection, a violent uprising against the government" and "sedition" but not a coup because Trump did not order the military "to seize power on his behalf". The Coup D'état Project of the Cline Center for Advanced Social Research at the University of Illinois, which tracks coups and coup attempts globally, classified the attack as an "attempted dissident coup", defined as an unsuccessful coup attempt "initiated by a small group of discontents" such as "ex-military leaders, religious leaders, former government leaders, members of a legislature/parliament, and civilians [but not police or the military]". The Cline Center said the "organized, illegal attempt to intervene in the presidential transition" by displacing Congress met this definition. Some political scientists identified the attack as an attempted self-coup, in which the head of government attempts to strong-arm the other branches of government to entrench power. Academic Fiona Hill, a former member of Trump's National Security Council, described the attack, and Trump's actions in the months leading up to it, as an attempted self-coup.

As mentioned, the FBI classified the attack as domestic terrorism. At the Senate Judiciary Committee meeting on March 2, 2021, Wray testified:

The Congressional Research Service also concluded that the attack met the federal definition of domestic terrorism. Republican senator Ted Cruz characterized it as terrorism at least eighteen times over the ensuing year, though he was among the Senate Republicans who blocked a bipartisan January 6 commission to investigate it.

Conservation of items damaged or left behind 
Signs, flags, stickers, Pelosi's damaged nameplate, and other items left behind from the riot will be preserved as historical artifacts in the collections of the House and Senate, and the National Museum of American History, and "shared with national museums", including the Smithsonians. On the morning of January7, military history curator Frank A. Blazich, Jr. volunteered to go to the National Mall where he spent three hours collecting an array of objects discarded along the National Mall, including a large repurposed street sign which read "STOP THE STEALOFF WITH THEIR HEADS," along with discarded protest signs, American flags, and other pro-Trump paraphernalia. Anthea M. Hartig, director of the Smithsonian's National Museum of American History, said the Smithsonian would seek to collect and preserve "objects and stories that help future generations remember and contextualize January6 and its aftermath", a statement echoed by Jane Campbell, president of the Capitol Historical Society.

Media documentation 
An hour-and-a-half unedited documentary film titled Full Video: The Seige  On United States Capitol was produced at the scene, and released on YouTube, by John Earle Sullivan, capturing many notable individuals and moments from the event, including the death of Ashli Babbitt. The author was deemed to be a participant to the civil disturbance and was charged with crimes.

Some recordings from Capitol surveillance cameras and DC Metropolitan police body cameras were made publicly available in June 2021, following a CNN-led lawsuit by major media outlets. The Justice Department had argued that releasing recordings of current defendants could interfere with their right to a fair trial.

Notable documentary films 

 On June 30, 2022, The New York Times released Day of Rage: How Trump Supporters Took the U.S. Capitol, a 40-minute narrated documentary assembled from thousands of video and audio recordings from the event, much of the material recorded by rioters, with some being obtained through motions to unseal police body-camera footage.
 In October 2022, HBO released Four Hours at the Capitol, a documentary by Jamie Roberts that details the events of the attack.
 In December 2022, HBO released This Place Rules, a documentary directed by the Channel 5 presenter Andrew Callaghan.
 In January 2023, Discovery+ released January 6th, a documentary by the French-American filmmakers Jules and Gédéon Naudet.

One-year anniversary 
Commemoration of the attack was seen leading up to and on the one-year anniversary in 2022 by right-wing groups, supporters of Trump, politicians, and the general public. President Biden gave a speech to commemorate the attack, in which he described the rioters as "holding a dagger to the throat of America" and claims that Trump held "singular responsibility" for the attack as "his bruised ego matters more to him than our democracy, our Constitution."

Many lawmakers observed a moment of silence at the House of Representatives chamber. A majority of Republican lawmakers were absent, excluding Liz Cheney (R-Wyo) and her father, former Vice-President Dick Cheney, who told reporters that the current Republican leadership did not resemble anything that he had seen ten years prior. Additional commemorative events were planned, including a moment of prayer, member testimonials, a prayer vigil, and a private event hosted by Pelosi, which thanked building staff for their protection during the attack.

A former Trump aide and founder of a right-wing organization, Matt Braynard, posted on Gab: "January 6th was America's Tiananmen Square. Join us in marking this lie with #J6vigils from coast to coast." While there was a sparse response to that post, there were planned protests to honor those who participated in the attack. A local chapter of the Proud Boys planned on holding a protest for all of those arrested afterwards, and an anti-mask protest planned in Beverly Hills was scheduled to be renamed after Ashli Babbitt.

Notes

References 

January 6 United States Capitol attack
Articles containing video clips